Dalj High School is a public high school in Dalj, Croatia. The school offers the students the following educational programs: Economist, Commercial Officer (in Serbian), Agricultural Technician and Agricultural Technician General. In accordance with rights derived from Erdut Agreement Serbian minority in this school use right of education in minority language. For this reason, students can attend classes in Croatian or Serbian language and Serbian Cyrillic alphabet.

Student cooperative
In the high school since the beginning of the nineties operates Student cooperative. On a voluntary basis students can participate in the work in orchard, greenhouse, wine cellar, hothouse, pond or apiary.

See also
 Dalj
 Erdut Municipality
 Cultural and Scientific Center "Milutin Milanković"
 Education in Croatia

References

External links
 http://ss-dalj.skole.hr/

Buildings and structures in Osijek-Baranja County
Schools in Croatia
Secondary schools in Croatia
Minority schools
Bilingual schools
Joint Council of Municipalities
Osijek-Baranja County
Educational institutions established in 1952
1952 establishments in Yugoslavia